Akiel Smalley (born 1984) is a professional football player who is currently a free agent. He most recently played with the York Capitals of the American Indoor Football (AIF). Smalley attended Gar-Field Senior High School in Woodbridge, Virginia.

References 

Central Penn Capitals players
1984 births
Living people
American football fullbacks
Players of American football from Philadelphia

3. http://phillysportsnetwork.com/2017/05/04/39776/